Clement Mitchell (20 February 1862 – 6 October 1937) was an English sportsman who represented the England national football team and played first-class cricket for Kent County Cricket Club.

Mitchell was born at Cambridge in 1862 and was educated at Felsted School. He was the first Englishman to score a hat-trick against Wales in an international, with goals in the 16th, 70th and 90th minutes of their 1883 clash at Kennington Oval. A centre-forward, he also scored a goal in a loss to Scotland a month later and in a 1–1 draw with Wales at the 1885 British Home Championship.

Mitchell had been a dominant batsman at school and played club cricket for Crystal Palace Cricket Club. In club cricket he scored double centuries and between 1890 and 1892 made eight first-class cricket appearances as a left-handed batsman for Kent. He had less success at county cricket level, scoring 126 runs at a batting average of less than 10 runs per innings.

Mitchell died at Aldrington in Sussex in 1937 aged 75.

References

External links

1862 births
1937 deaths
English footballers
England international footballers
Upton Park F.C. players
English cricketers
Kent cricketers
Association footballers not categorized by position